Nezeheh (also known as Qeyzānīyeh-ye Kūchak) is a village in Gheyzaniyeh Rural District, in the Central District of Ahvaz County, Khuzestan Province, Iran. At the 2006 census, its population was 2,446, in 473 families.

References 

Populated places in Ahvaz County